Goodenia granitica is a species of flowering plant in the family Goodeniaceae and endemic to the south-west of Western Australia. It is an annual herb with spatula-shaped, sometimes lobed leaves, in a rosette at the base of the plant, and racemes of yellow flowers.

Description

Taxonomy and naming
Goodenia granitica was first formally described in 2007 by Leigh William Sage and Kelly Anne Shepherd in the journal Nuytsia from material collected by Sage near Chiddarcooping Hill in 2001. The specific epithet (granitica) refers to the plant's growing near granite outcrops.

Distribution and habitat
This goodenia is only known from three populations in the Avon Wheatbelt biogeographic region, where it grows in moist soil near the base of granite outcrops and on valley floors.

Conservation status
Goddenia granitica is classified as "Priority Two" by the Western Australian Government Department of Parks and Wildlife meaning that it is poorly known and from only one or a few locations.

References

granitica
Eudicots of Western Australia
Plants described in 2007
Taxa named by Kelly Anne Shepherd